Bull Creek is a tributary of the Allegheny River in Allegheny and Butler counties, Pennsylvania in the United States.

Course

Bull Creek joins the Allegheny River at the borough of Tarentum.

Tributaries
(Mouth at the Allegheny River)

 Little Bull Creek joins Bull Creek via a culvert underneath Bull Creek Road (Pennsylvania Route 366) at Tarentum.
 McDowell Run joins Bull Creek near the intersection of Bull Creek Road and Howes Run Road in Fawn Township.
 Lardintown Run joins Bull Creek near the intersection of Bull Creek Road and Lardintown Road in Fawn Township.
 Rocky Run joins Bull Creek near the intersection of Saxonburg Boulevard and Cherry Valley Road in Clinton Township.

See also

 List of rivers of Pennsylvania
 List of tributaries of the Allegheny River

References

External links

U.S. Geological Survey: PA stream gaging stations

Rivers of Pennsylvania
Tributaries of the Allegheny River
Rivers of Allegheny County, Pennsylvania
Rivers of Butler County, Pennsylvania